Richard Roy is a Canadian director, actor and screenwriter.  He has directed several feature films in French as well as television films and series for the English-language market.

He was raised in the village of Saint-Agapit, in Lotbinière Regional County Municipality, Chaudière-Appalaches, Quebec. His childhood in Saint-Agapit provided the inspiration for his autobiographical 2011 film, Frisson des Collines.

Filmography

Director
 1990: Moody Beach
 1996: Caboose
 1997: Le Masque (TV series)
 2000: Café Olé
 2002 : Le Dernier chapitre: La Suite (TV mini-series)
 2003: Deception (video)
 2003: The Last Chapter II: The War Continues (TV mini-series)
 2004: A Deadly Encounter (TV)
 2005: Crimes of Passion (TV)
 2005: Forbidden Secrets (TV)
 2006: Flirting With Danger (TV)
 2006: Thrill of the Kill (TV)
 2009: Final Verdict (TV)
 2011: Thrill of the Hills (Frisson des collines)

Performances
 1989 : Lessons on Life (Trois pommes à côté du sommeil): Le client du Varimag

Screenplays
 1990 : Moody Beach
 1996 : Caboose (film)

References

External links
 
 Richard Roy at Association des réalisateurs et réalisatrices du Québec

Film directors from Quebec
Canadian screenwriters in French
Canadian male film actors
People from Chaudière-Appalaches
Year of birth missing (living people)
Living people